Maxwell–Boltzmann distribution
 The Maxwellians (1991 book)

See also 
List of things named after James Clerk Maxwell